Macrostemum zebratum, the zebra caddisfly, is a species of netspinning caddisfly in the family Hydropsychidae. It is found in North America.

References

External links

 

Trichoptera
Articles created by Qbugbot
Insects described in 1861